Ogema is a town with a population of 403 located in south Central Saskatchewan, Canada.

History
The small Saskatchewan community known as Ogema and its surrounding community got its first settlers in 1908. Most of those settlers came from the Bruce and Huron county regions in Ontario, but a few came from other parts of the world, including the United States, Europe and the British Isles.

The first settlers arrived in 1908. However, it wasn't until 1911 that a post office was established with the name of Ogema. The inaugural homesteaders of the land selected “Omega” as its name. “Omega” is a Greek term for the word “end.” The settlers chose this name because, at the time of settlement, it was “the end of the rail-line.” However, when it came time to register the name, they were told by the authorities that there was another town with that name and no two communities with the same name would be allowed. So it came to be that two letters were switched, and “Ogema” was born. Ogema is an Anishinaabemowin (Ojibwe) word meaning “Chief.”

The lots for the town of Ogema were sold by the Canadian Pacific Railway, which was then building a branch line through the wilderness of southern Saskatchewan.

During the early years of settlement, several modes of transportation were used. Along with walking, a people traveled by horseback, wagons, buggies and sleighs for the winter.

	Living quarters were prepared by the men, who led ahead of their families to make sure the homestead was ready. Power to these homesteads was supplied by oxen, mules or horses. The horses were fed with grain obtained through threshing. The seeding was done with wooden box drills. Threshing time was very exciting for the people of Ogema, as it was seen as the payoff for a year's worth of homesteading.

	The period of 1911 to 1913 was a fascinating time for the settlement. First, in February 1911, Ogema was declared a village on the west 1/2 at 22-7-22. On August 10, 1911, the Canadian Pacific Railway line between Assiniboia and Weyburn reached Ogema. The next year was even more exciting, with a telegraph line reaching the village, construction of the first curling rink, and the village's first official sports day being held on June 12. On July 5, 1912, lumber yard manager Raymond Kenneth Rounds coordinated a census which concluded that there were 540 citizens living in the village.

	On October 4, a motion of council proclaimed “Be it resolved that secretary-treasurer post up notices of the intention of village council to apply to the Lieutenant-Governor in Council for the corporation of the village into a town.” In December 1912, having attained a population of 500, Ogema's status was upgraded from village to town.

On February 8, 1913, elections for council were held for the newborn town and A.R. Sargent was named mayor.

	The year 1914 marked the beginning of the First World War and the town's men were quick to enlist in the military. They quickly sold or rented their homesteads and went off to war.
 
	 Disaster struck the town in January 1915 when a fire broke out on the east side of Main Street and destroyed nine businesses. Below zero temperatures contributed to the freezing of the fire engine, and so it was of minimal use when it came to extinguishing the fire.

	As the war wound down, the town struggled to adjust as the men returned home from the battlefield. Due to injuries sustained while fighting, some of the men could no longer do farm work and had to find other jobs. Also around this period, a flu epidemic seized the town and wiped out entire families.

	Eventually, though, the returning soldiers settled into their new jobs and the epidemic passed, giving the people of Ogema renewed hope for the 1920s.

1920-1945 
The 1920s in Ogema, Saskatchewan were a time of innovation, as inventions were developed to help the farming world. The 1930s marked the beginning of the Depression that affected Ogema as well. In 1939, with the beginning of the Second World War, young men and women enlisted in the service.

1920s 
There was a boom in Ogema in the 1920s. The economy was based on "mixed farming and ranching."

Weather 

Farmers were mainly at the mercy of the prairie weather. People would do their best to prepare their animals and weigh down hay; however there was no shelter to break the prairie storms.

Inventions 

Radio: when invented, some claimed that it would cure deafness and headaches. While inaccurate, the people of Ogema could now hear news from far away.

Cars: Self-starters were added, accelerators took over gas levers, cabs enclosed in glass, and trucks began appearing in Ogema.

Farm: Tractors began to take over from horses.

Town: Cement Sidewalks started in 1927 and were financed by debentures. Scouting: started in 1927 with three patrols and held summer camps in Willow Bunch Lake.

Leading up to the Depression 
1928 marked a high in wheat production. However, for years farmers burned their fields to get rid of stubble and make way for the next year's crop. They did not understand at the time that this could take all the moisture from the ground. Around the beginning of the 1930s, rainfall declined and the soil dried, harming plant-roots. Wind turned to gales that lasted days and at times the sun turned "blood red".

1930s 
The "Dirty Thirties" were a bad time for Ogema. Not much was growing and the drought was deep; wells ran dry and water had to be hauled in. The Canadian government sent "relief" cars that brought in vegetables, fish, bedding, and other basics to the rural residents. Settlers faced "hot dry winds, dust storms, and grasshoppers."

Transportation 

In the 1930s, there was a food and gas shortage. Many took the engines out of their cars and attached horses to the front. They were called "Bennett Buggies"

Population 

Ogema experienced an "exodus" during this time. Problems arose as people weren't able to afford their property taxes and many families packed up and left, others stayed and tried their best.

Farming 

The government offered financial assistance to farmers for dugouts and set up "community pastures." Farmers were now also faced with the task of finding rust-resistant wheat.

1940-1945 
The Second World War hit closer to home than previous wars for the people of Ogema, as now there were radios that broadcast daily reports.

The lack of laborers forced farmers to invest in better machinery, which helped increase production. Quickly there was a grain surplus and thus more storage places and quonsets were built. As well, ration books were needed for things such as gasoline and "imported food stuffs."

WW2 "Honour Roll" 

Babb, Z; Birney, J.F.; Booth, W.; Cojocari, D.; Coubrough, G.T.; Gauley, A.; Gebert, J.; Jones, W.E.; Krasium, G.; Lemke, J.; Mackenzie, E.N.; Miller, H.; Pagan, G.; Richmond, H.; Smailes, F.; Smith, E.D.; Scott, R.B.; Scott, R.T.; Woods, S.; Woolhether, S.

Mayors 

Ogema had 6 mayors between 1920-1945

A.F. Class (1920-1922)

Hugh Townsend (1923-1930)

Harry Brogden (1930-1933)

Harry King (1934-1938)

J.E. Lloyd (1939-1942)

Harry King (1942-1944)

Post-War Period

4H Club 

The Boys and Girls Club Work, the present 4H program in Ogema, was organized in 1949 with a mostly agricultural focus. Two of the clubs include the Ogema Beef Club and the Ogema Homestead Club. Achievements from both are recognized beyond Ogema. The Ogema Beef Club team took first place at the Farm Boys Camp in Regina in 1955. The Ogema Homestead Club also placed first at the Moose Jaw Farm Girls' Camp in the same year. The 4H clubs travel by bus for tours all around Saskatchewan. In 1965, both clubs came together to form the Ogema 4H Multiple Club, which continues presently. Most Achievement Days and meetings are held at the Ogema School.

Old Timer's Club 

The Old Timer's Club was created in 1956 for the seniors of Ogema. The club gets together to socialize, playing games such as whilst and cribbage. At the club's most successful point, it reached 35 members.

Water Tower 

In 1961, the water tower was built to provide a safe water supply for the people living in Ogema. The well is drilled 248 feet deep. More water pipes were set in place and more fire hydrants installed, showing a definite sign of progress for the town.

Deep South Pioneer Museum 

The town of Ogema has been known as a place of heritage since the establishment of the Deep South Pioneer Museum in 1977. Residents wanted a safe place to store and present their heritage valuables, so volunteers worked to restore them until they were ready for display. At first, the museum buildings were spread over five acres of land, which soon became too small, so another five acres were purchased. The Deep South Pioneer Museum opened to the public on July 12, 1980, in correlation with Saskatchewan's 75th birthday. The museum maintains over 30 buildings, many of which were moved from Main Street and areas surrounding Ogema. Each building holds artifacts to take visitors on a tour of pioneer living, especially in terms of agriculture: The museum houses over 150 pieces of old farm equipment. The buildings include a drug store, an Anglican church, and homes.

Museum Day 

The day after the Agricultural Society Annual Fair Day is Museum Day. Visitors take a tour of the museum and watch demonstrations made in the buildings about the pioneer way of life. The day begins with a pancake breakfast, then a church service, and then demonstrations, which include blacksmithing, flour-making, and rope-making. Together, the Agricultural Society Fair Day and Museum Day are meant to be an event to take pride in Ogema’s new and old citizens, and attract visitors from outside of the area.

Dance Club 

The Ogema Dance Club was created in 1995. In 2017, the club has approximately 45 dancers. Teacher Shayla Brown rehearses students twice a week in the Ogema Heritage Hall. The club hosts a competition and recital in the Ogema School every year, and travels to competitions in Regina and Avonlea.

Riding Arena 

In 2001, the Ogema Riding Arena was built by members of the Big Muddy Team Roping Association. Many roping and barrel racing events take place here. The largest purpose of the arena is for the annual Agricultural Society Fair Day every July, where a kid’s rodeo and horse pulls take place.

Town Administration 

In 2017, the mayor of Ogema is Carol Prentice, the Town Administrator is Peggy Tuchscherer, and the Community Development Officer is Tanya Leonard.

Geography
The town of Ogema is naturally an internal drainage basin, with rolling hills and shallow sloughs. Typically, these sloughs mark regional low spots and are fed by a series of interconnected sloughs called kettle chains.

Demographics 

Numerous Filipinos live in the town, many of whom initially arrived to work at the Big Sky hog barn that opened in 2000.

Government
Ogema has a mayor as the highest ranking government official. They also elects aldermen or councillors to form the municipal council. The current mayor is Carol Prentice, who replaced mayor Wayne Myren.

Provincially Ogema is within the Weyburn-Big Muddy constituency served by their MLA who is currently Hon. Dustin Duncan, Minister of Environment.

Ogema is represented in the House of Commons of Canada by MP of the Souris—Moose Mountain riding. Currently this is Robert Kitchen.

Education
Ogema received its first school in 1911. A larger school was built in 1919 in the centre of town with several additions being built over the next 20 years. Ogema is currently served by Ogema School, a K-12 school built in 1961 which is located in the South East Cornerstones School Division No. 209. The school has an enrolment of approximately 100 students.

Points of interest
Ogema is currently rebranding itself into a heritage hotspot. Ogema is quickly becoming a destination for tourists looking to experience the early 1900s and what early pioneers accomplished. Some other buildings include Moffet and Robertson General Merchants, Andrew Fraser's Department Store, The Ogema Theatre and The Ogema Meat Market.

The Ogema Fire Hall 
The Fire Hall and Fire Wall were built after the fire of 1915 that destroyed much of Ogema's Main Street to prevent any future fires from spreading. The Fire Hall is equipped with a cistern to hold water to fight fires, and a jail cell. Attached to the Fire Hall and on the opposite side of the street there is a brick wall that measures 30 feet high, 70 feet long and 16 inches thick. This Fire Wall is designed to stop fires from spreading along the businesses of Main Street. The Wall is of significant importance because it was considered a foolish investment by government officials and wouldn't last longer that a decade. Now, nearly 95 years later it is one of the few structures of its kind in Saskatchewan.  The Fire Hall and Wall are both Municipal Heritage Properties.

1912 Canadian Pacific Railway Train Station 
Ogema's original train station stood at the south end of Main Street on the north side of the railway tracks. Construction began on a train line from Weyburn to Assiniboia in 1909. By 1912 the line reached Ogema which was the midway point, and was completed in 1912. After passenger use declined and the station closed down, it was removed from the site and sold for scrap in the 1960s. In the early 2000s a committee was struck to oversee the return of a 1912 CPR train station to the original site. And in 2002, a station, being used as a grain bin at the time, was located and transported from Simpson, SK to Ogema. Over the next 7 years 1000 of hours of labour were put into the station and in the summer of 2009 it was opened to the public, nearly fully restored and furnished with original furniture and artifacts. Today, the Station has been fully refurbished and Southern Prairie Railway runs historical train tours from Ogema.

The Ogema Heritage Grandstand 
The grandstand was originally built in the 1920s by the Ogema Agricultural society. It is currently the oldest community grandstand in Western Canada, and it is still the site of the Ogema Agricultural Society Annual Fair day, which is the longest running agricultural fair in Saskatchewan. In 2004, the grandstand was dedicated to Arleene Johnson Noga, a women’s American baseball player who was raised in Ogema. This grandstand and field are home to the Ogema Colts, a men's baseball team in the Borderline Fastball League.

Ogema Regional Park 
The Ogema Regional Park includes a skating rink, curling rink, pool, heritage hall and the Ogema Grandstand. In the spring of 1911, the Town of Ogema and The Canadian Pacific Railway began construction on a small park surrounding the train station. This park eventually became part of the regional park. It was originally owned by the Ogema Agricultural Society. On July 26, 1967, the park title was transferred from the Ogema Agricultural Society to the Regional Park Authority, allowing for the park to be given regional park status.

The Jean Shaver Art Gallery 
Jean Shaver, Born 1889, was an artist who lived mostly outside Bengough. Built in 2016, her pioneer art is housed in the art gallery at the Deep South Pioneer Museum.

The British American Gas Station 
The British America Gas Station is the only heritage service station in Saskatchewan. It was first built in 1925 by Harry Brogden, and closed in 1985. The town has since restored the filling station and in 1997 it was given Municipal Heritage Property Status.

Deep South Pioneer Museum 
The museum was first organized in 1977 by interested persons from Ogema, Pangman, Bengough, Avonlea and other districts. These individuals felt the need to preserve the history and heritage of the local community. Land was purchased near the outskirts of town. Over the past 30 years, the museum has accumulated over 30 restored buildings and over 1000 pieces of farm equipment. Its hundreds of thousands of artifacts and items make it the largest community owned museum in Western Canada. An annual "Museum Day" is held during the second Sunday in July. This event offers blacksmith, threshing and rope making demonstrations as well as a parade and musical entertainment. Many of the buildings in the museum have false fronts which were a common aesthetic characteristic of the early 1900s.

Services

Deep South Animal Clinic 

The Deep South Animal Clinic opened on August 15, 1973 in front of around 150 people.  The 36' x 60' clinic cost $65,000 to build and was designed as an out-patient animal clinic, featuring multiple facilities.  These facilities include an isolation area, operating areas for small & large animals, a hydraulic operating table for large animals, a kennel, a laboratory, a post-mortem room, an office, and a reception area.

The Ogema district veterinary board opened the clinic with a grant of $25,000 from the provincial Government of Saskatchewan, and a $11,000 grant from the federal Government of Canada, under the local initiatives program, while the board paid the remainder.  A district farmer, Wilfred Edworthy, officially unlocked the clinic at the opening ceremony.  Before the animal clinic opened, operations on livestock took place in Edworthy’s barn.

Today, the Deep South Animal Clinic provides service to Ogema and surrounding areas, including Weyburn, Regina, Moose Jaw, and Assiniboia. The clinic is open year-round for 24-hour emergency services.

Ogema School 

The Ogema School ranges from kindergarten to grade twelve, and is located on Mehnke Street.  The school offers a variety of courses, giving students the option to pursue further studies in post-secondary institutions.

In August 1991, there were 186 students enrolled in the school, while current enrollment is 112 students.  The school has an active sports program, and in 1988, they improved their track & field facilities.  The school also hosts the South East Cornerstone Public School Division Annual Track Meet.

The Ogema Hospital 

In 1949, a building committee began with a $20,000 donation, and a desire to get permission to build a 15-bed hospital.  The people of Ogema wanted a hospital for many reasons. The people wanted their own way to care for the ill, because they did not want to rely on city hospitals or the one nearby in Bengough, due to certain roads not being safe for travel, and also because some of the ill would not be able to travel to those hospitals.

In 1959, after 10 years, many hours of fundraising, construction, and delays, the hospital still had not opened its doors.  Although the building was not quite complete, the Health Minister, J. Walter Erb, deemed the building to be already out of date, and not fit to be a hospital.

Eventually the project came to an end, and today, Ogema still does not have a hospital within the town.

Banks

The Royal Bank 
In 1989 the Royal Bank in Ogema was fully renovated, which included expanding the building with a 20’ x 40’ addition, and constructing a wheelchair ramp.  During these renovations, the bank was also fully computerized and modernized.

In 1990 the Royal Bank celebrated its 80th anniversary in Ogema.  The bank is also active in community events, especially by sponsoring various awards, and participating in the annual fair.

Radius Credit Union 
In 1984 the Radius Credit Union in Ogema decided to computerize.  With computerization came new products including Master Card product lines and automated tellers.  At the same time registered retirement savings plans, registered retirement income funds, interest bearing chequing, youth accounts, and some insurance services were emerging.

In 1987, it became clear that the Credit Union would either have to renovate the existing building, or move into a new one.  After looking at the decisions of other Credit Unions with similar problems, they decided to renovate, and early in 1988, the Board of Directors sent out letters to all the local tradesmen with the renovation plan.  In the fall of 1988, the newly renovated Credit Union had its grand opening.

In 1990, the Credit Union celebrated its 40th anniversary in Ogema.

Other services 
Other services in Ogema include the Ogema library, and the post office.

Business and industry 
Mr. T.M. Gamble wrote a letter in 1913 describing the town.  “Ogema has the appearance of a very busy and energetic little town, it is fortunate in having many citizens of good standing with marked ability for developing a town. It has no less than seven stores, one bank, a bakery, two large livery stables with the prospects of a third, four lumber yards, two others coming in, five machine companies, two flour and feed stores, one starting in business, no hotel but three restaurants, a number of offices and residential buildings.”

Hotels

The Royal Hotel was built by Jake Nurnberger in 1910 on Railway Avenue, a two and a half storey building. Their dining room, the first in the town, was used by the railway construction crews, and later by the people arriving by train.  Also in 1910, the Whittam Brothers built the Ogema Hotel, although this came to be used as an apartment building under the later ownership of Eddie Sadler. Then in 1914, T.H. West built the National Hotel.

There are currently two hotels in Ogema. The Little Amego Inn is located at 306 Railway Avenue and has eight guest rooms, and the Ogema Motel is located at 404 Railway Avenue and has fifteen guest rooms.

The Ogema Co-operative Association

The Ogema Co-operative Association was incorporated in 1940. Its original board of directors was President J. Scott Burns, F.J. Mead, A.E. Johnson, P.G. McGregor, C.W. Heron, A.D. Mc Phail, with C.B. Grainger as secretary and Roy Farr as the manager.  Each of these members had to buy barrels of fuel and two five dollar shares.  Although the business started out on the east side of the town, the tanks and shed moved in 1941 to a local farm, the Earl Farr farm.  After the manager Roy Farr resigned, the Association wanted to move these back into the town, but the War Time Prices and Trade Board did not allow it.  After a period of inactivity, the Ogema Co-operative Association dissolved in 1954.

In 1940, the Bures Co-op was incorporated. This store was moved to the north side of Ogema in 1954, and four years later they bought a building in the centre of town, which they added on to. In 1988, a new store was built that was 40 feet by 80 feet for $60,630.00, and it officially opened on April 13, 1989.   The name changed from Bures Co-op to Ogema Co-op in 1984 so people wouldn’t be confused about the store's location.  The Ogema Co-op is currently located at 302 Railway Avenue.

Solo Italia Fine Pasta Inc.

The Solo Italia Fine Pasta Inc began in Ogema in 2013. The owners, Marco and Tracey de Michele, moved to Ogema in 2012 from Italy and they brought authentic Italian pizza, pasta, and espresso beans with them.

Big Sky Farms Inc.

In 2000, Big Sky Farms Inc. opened hog production facilities in Ogema, creating around 45 jobs in the community. The 188,000 square foot facility has space for 5,000 hogs and is the largest facility of its kind in Western Canada.

Other businesses

Other Ogema businesses include Deep South Cafe and Bowl, Ogema Cafe, Rolling Hills Restaurant, Ogema Foods, NAPA Auto Parts, and A Touch of Wellness Day Spa & Wellness Centre.

Notable people 
Notable people who were born, grew up in, or lived in Ogema
 Arleene Johnson (1924 - 2017), All American Girls Professional Baseball League Player
 Tasha Hubbard (born 1973), Film maker from Ogema known for her documentaries Birth of a Family and Two World's Colliding. After her adopted father died when she was two years old she, along with her adopted mother, moved to Ogema, Sask., where they lived until Hubbard was 11 years old, before moving around Saskatchewan with her adopted family.
 Alfred Ross Sargent was the first mayor of Ogema. He held office in 1913 and 1914 before moving to Viceroy in 1914. Sargent came to the area in 1909 and operated the first store named Sargent and Brunston.
 Murdock Matheson was the first teacher in Ogema and taught there from July 3, 1911 to June 1914. Matheson was part of the first Normal School staff in 1927 before moving on to teach at the University of Saskatchewan, where he stayed until he retired in 1946. Matheson wrote a book called "Looking Backwards Over My 50 Years in Saskatchewan," that was published in 1960.
 Alfred Taylor was born in Leicester England in 1885. He arrived in the area in 1906 where he lived on a quarter of land and worked in Regina as a plumber. Eventually Taylor was forced to sell his quarter of land to the railway in 1910. This Quarter of Land is where the town of Ogema is located. Taylor joined the army in 1916 and while overseas came down with Rheumatic fever while in the trenches and was taken to an England hospital where he met Mable White. In March 1920 the two were married, and eventually were buried side by side in the town cemetery when he died July 4, 1960. Taylor was a brother to William, and a father to Charlotte, born in 1921, and Doug, born in 1923. In Ogema there is a street named in the honour of Taylor who was the first settler in the area.
 Layne Jackson grew up in Ogema, Sask. On September 12, 2017 Jackson was named the new Fire Chief of Regina, Sask. Jackson served as the Deputy Chief of the Regina fire department since 2009.

Media
Ogema is currently serviced by the  Deep South Star .

In the Provincial Archives of Saskatchewan, there is a copy of the South Country Times from 1931. It served Ogema and adjacent towns, villages and hamlets.

It gives an idea of newspapers of the time. Articles included:

"Card of Thanks"; Who was visiting: "Miss Muriel Reid spent the weekend with Miss Dorothy Geig at Horizon." Also, lost and found, depression relief efforts --"FRUIT VEGETABLES-- a carload of fruit and vegetables is expected in Ogema by the end of the week or the beginning of next." As well as wanted ads/rent ads, the latest on boy scouts, and a "Tax Sales List" with a description of property and the cost for each pieces. They were sold at an auction.

Newspapers were a main way to know what was happening in the town in the early 1900s.

See also
Saskatchewan
List of communities in Saskatchewan
List of place names in Canada of Indigenous origin

References

External links

Key West No. 70, Saskatchewan
Towns in Saskatchewan
Division No. 2, Saskatchewan